The 2005 Villanova Wildcats football team represented Villanova University in the 2005 NCAA Division I FCS football season as a member of the Atlantic 10 Conference (A-10). The Wildcats were led by 21st year head coach Andy Talley and played their home games at Villanova Stadium. They finished the season with an overall record of four wins and seven losses (4–7, 2–6 in the A-10).

Schedule

References

Villanova
Villanova Wildcats football seasons
Villanova Wildcats football